is a 1965 kaiju film directed by Ishirō Honda, with special effects by Eiji Tsuburaya. The film stars Nick Adams, Kumi Mizuno and Tadao Takashima, with Koji Furuhata as Frankenstein and Haruo Nakajima as Baragon. An international co-production of Japan and the United States; it was the first collaboration between Toho Co., Ltd and Henry G. Saperstein. In the film, scientists investigate the origins of a mysterious boy and his resistance to radiation that makes him grow to monstrous size, while a second monster ravages the countryside.

Frankenstein vs. Baragon was theatrically released in Japan on August 8, 1965, followed by a theatrical release in the United States on July 8, 1966 by American International Pictures as Frankenstein Conquers the World. The film was followed by The War of the Gargantuas, released on July 31, 1966.

Plot 
During World War II in Nazi Germany, Nazi officers confiscate the living heart of the Frankenstein Monster from Dr. Riesendorf and pass it on to the Imperial Japanese Navy, who take it to a research facility in Hiroshima for further experimentation. As the experiments begin, Hiroshima is bombed with a nuclear weapon by the Americans. Fifteen years later, a feral boy runs rampant in the streets of Hiroshima, catching and devouring small animals. This comes to the attention of American scientist Dr. James Bowen and his assistants Drs. Sueko Togami and Ken'ichiro Kawaji. A year later, they find the boy hiding in a cave on a beach, cornered by outraged villagers. Bowen and his team take care of the boy and discover that he is building a strong resistance to radiation.

The former Imperial Navy officer Kawai, who brought the heart to Hiroshima's army hospital, is now working in an oil factory in Akita Prefecture, when a sudden earthquake destroys the refinery. Kawai catches a glimpse of a non-human monster within a fissure before it disappears. Meanwhile, Bowen and his team find out that the strange boy is growing in size due to an intake of protein. Afraid of his strength, the scientists lock and chain the boy in a cage and Sueko, who cares for him, feeds him some protein-filled food to sustain him. Bowen is visited by Kawai, who tells him that the boy could have grown from the heart of the Frankenstein Monster, as the boy was seen in Hiroshima more than once before. At Bowen's advice, Kawaji confers with Riesendorf in Frankfurt. Riesendorf recommends cutting off a limb, speculating that a new one will grow back. Sueko and Bowen strongly object to this method.

Ignoring Bowen's suggestion to think it over, Kawaji tenaciously attempts to sever one of the limbs of the boy-turned-giant, now called "Frankenstein". He is interrupted by a TV crew, who enrage Frankenstein with bright studio lights and Frankenstein breaks loose. Frankenstein visits Sueko at her apartment before disappearing. A severed hand of Frankenstein's is found, proving Riesendorf's theory (the hand then dies due to lack of protein). Unbeknownst to Bowen and his team, the subterranean burrowing dinosaur Baragon ravages various villages. The Japanese authorities and media believe this to be Frankenstein's doing and Frankenstein narrowly escapes being hunted down by the Japan Self-Defense Forces. Before Bowen and his team dismiss Frankenstein, Kawai returns to tell them that Frankenstein may not be responsible for the disasters; it could be the monster (Baragon) he saw in Akita. He tries to convince the authorities, but to no avail. Kawaji still wishes the scientists luck in finding and saving Frankenstein.

Bowen, Sueko and Kawaji attempt to find Frankenstein on their own. To Bowen and Sueko's shock, Kawaji reveals his plans to kill Frankenstein by blinding him with grenades in order to recover his heart and his brain. Kawaji presses on to find Frankenstein, but finds Baragon instead. Kawaji and Bowen try in vain to stop Baragon with the grenades. Frankenstein emerges in time to save Sueko and engages Baragon. The monsters battle until Frankenstein snaps Baragon's neck. Then the ground beneath them collapses and swallows them up. Kawaji states that the immortal heart will live on and they may one day see him again, but Bowen believes that Frankenstein is better off dead.

Cast

Production 

Toho had always been interested in the Frankenstein character as, in 1961, producer Tomoyuki Tanaka commissioned a film project called Frankenstein vs. the Human Vapor. Acting as a sequel to the 1960 film The Human Vapor, the Mizuno character from that film finds the Frankenstein Monster's body and revives him so that he can help him use the Frankenstein formula to revive his beloved girlfriend Fujichiyo (who had died at the end of said film). As a rough draft of the story was being written by Takeshi Kimura (using the pen name Kaoru Mabuchi), it was ultimately cancelled before the draft was finished.

In 1962, Toho purchased a script from an independent producer from America named John Beck called King Kong vs. Prometheus. Beck had stolen the story treatment (which was originally called King Kong Meets Frankenstein) from Willis O'Brien and had George Worthing Yates flesh it out into a screenplay. Toho wanted to have King Kong fight their own monster Godzilla instead of the giant Frankenstein monster in the original story and, after working out a deal with Beck as well as RKO, the copyright holder of King Kong at the time, produced King Kong vs. Godzilla.

In 1964, Henry Saperstein approached Toho to co-produce Frankenstein vs. Godzilla with his company United Productions of America. The story would pit Godzilla against a giant Frankenstein Monster. Takeshi Kimura was hired to write the screenplay with Jerry Sohl and Reuben Bercovitch writing the story and synopsis for the film. The story dealt with the heart of the original Frankenstein monster becoming irradiated and growing into a giant Frankenstein Monster. Afraid the giant would start eating people, Godzilla would be awakened from slumber in the Kurile Trench by the JSDF and goaded into a fight with the Monster in hopes of destroying him. The story would end with natural disasters defeating the monsters as Godzilla disappears into a raging river flow, and the giant Frankenstein Monster disappears into magma caused by an erupting volcano.

Toho was not fond of the logistics of the story, so the idea was dropped. When the Godzilla series would resume later that year, Mothra was brought in as Godzilla's next opponent for the film Mothra vs. Godzilla instead.

In 1965, Toho and UPA would revive the project into this film. A new dinosaurian opponent named Baragon was created to replace Godzilla as Frankenstein's opponent and the script was slightly altered. Most of the concepts from the original story treatment were retained in this version, such as the irradiated heart of the Monster, the Monster's relentless pursuit of food and a natural disaster defeating the Monster during the climax. In addition, most of the characters from the original story, such as research scientist Dr. Bowen (played by Nick Adams), would be retained. In the American version, Jerry Sohl would get credit for a synopsis and executive producer Reuben Bercovitch would get credit for the story.

Koji Furuhata earned the role of Frankenstein through an open audition. Furuhata wore green contact lenses to emulate a Caucasian look, a flat-head prosthetic and brow resembling Jack Pierce's Frankenstein Monster design and large shirts and loincloths. Honda had originally wanted to explore more of the science-gone-wrong theme, but was forced to change the story in the middle to reach a climactic monster battle. Nick Adams delivered all of his lines in English, while everyone else delivered their lines in Japanese.

Alternate ending 
Henry G. Saperstein had requested an alternative ending for the international release in which Frankenstein battled a giant octopus, who eventually defeated Frankenstein by dragging him into a lake. This resulted in the cast and crew being reassembled after principal photography and post-production had wrapped, as well as building a new set and building a new prop to represent the giant octopus from foam, latex and sawdust initially moulded over a wire frame for support during construction. Despite filming the new ending, Saperstein ended up cutting it regardless because he believed the giant octopus "wasn't that good".

When the film was in production, trade magazines listed this film's title as Frankenstein vs. the Giant Devilfish. Honda had stated that the reason why the giant octopus ending was initially requested was because the American co-producers were "astonished" by the giant octopus scene in King Kong vs. Godzilla and wanted a similar scene in this film. Honda also confirmed that various endings were shot, stating: "In fact Mr. Tsuburaya had shot five or six final scenes for this film. The infamous giant octopus is only one of these endings." Honda also expressed that the alternate ending was never intended to be released on the Japanese version, stating: "there was never any official plan to utilize the sequence; but an alternative print with that ending was accidentally aired on television surprising many Japanese fans because it was not the ending they had remembered from the original theatrical release."

Release

Theatrical
The film was released in Japan on August 8, 1965, two days after the 20th anniversary of the Hiroshima bombing. The film grossed ¥93 million during its Japanese theatrical run. The film was released theatrically in the United States as Frankenstein Conquers the World on July 8, 1966 by American International Pictures. This version was dubbed in English by Titan Productions and restored Adams' original English dialogue.

Home media
In June 2007, Tokyo Shock released Frankenstein vs. Baragon on a two-disc DVD, the first time the film was released on DVD in North America. This version includes the original Japanese theatrical version, the American version (running at 84 minutes), and the international version with the alternate giant octopus ending (running at 93 minutes). All three versions were presented in widescreen. The international version (titled Frankenstein vs. the Giant Devilfish) features an audio commentary by Sadamasa Arikawa, the film's special effects photographer. Disc two features two Japanese trailers, deleted scenes and a photo gallery, which was provided by Ed Godziszewski (editor of Japanese Giants and author of The Illustrated Encyclopedia of Godzilla). In November 2017, Toho released the film on Blu-ray in Japan. This release also includes an HD remaster of the international version.

In September 2022, The Criterion Collection announced to have acquired the Japanese version to stream on their site the Criterion Channel.

Sequel 

The following year, Toho released a sequel titled The War of the Gargantuas, also co-produced with UPA. In the film, pieces of Frankenstein's cells mutate into two giant humanoid monsters: Sanda (the Brown Gargantua) and Gaira (the Green Gargantua). The former is a benevolent and peace-loving creature, while the latter is murderous and savage. Apart from a reference to a severed hand, UPA obscured all references to Frankenstein in the American version and the names of the monsters were changed to the Brown Gargantua and the Green Gargantua. Gaira and Sanda would later appear in two of Toho's tokusatsu series, Ike! Godman and Ike! Greenman, before remaining absent for over 40 years, with Gaira making his latest appearance in a 2008 Go! Godman special.

See also 
 List of films featuring Frankenstein's monster

Notes

References

Bibliography
 
 
 Famous Monsters of Filmland #39 (June 1966), cover and pp. 10–24 (pictures and plot summary)

External links 

 
 
 
 
 フランケンシュタイン対地底怪獣 (Furankenshutain tai Chitei Kaijū Baragon) at Japanese Movie Database 

1965 films
1960s science fiction films
1960s monster movies
Films about dinosaurs
Toho films
UPA films
American International Pictures films
Films about cephalopods
Films directed by Ishirō Honda
Films set in 1945
Films set in 1960
Films set in 1961
Films set in Gunma Prefecture
Films set in Hiroshima
Films set in Osaka
Films set in Shiga Prefecture
Frankenstein films
Giant monster films
1960s Japanese-language films
Kaiju films
Films about nuclear war and weapons
Films about size change
Films about the atomic bombings of Hiroshima and Nagasaki
1960s science fiction horror films
Toho tokusatsu films
Films produced by Tomoyuki Tanaka
Films scored by Akira Ifukube
Films about giants
American science fiction horror films
Films set in Germany
Films about Nazis
Films about Nazi Germany
Nazi zombie films
Japan Self-Defense Forces in fiction
1960s American films
1960s Japanese films